Hair: Original Soundtrack Recording is the soundtrack album from the 1979 musical film Hair.  It was released on the RCA Victor label.  

The film omits the musical's songs "The Bed", "Dead End", "Oh Great God of Power", "I Believe in Love", "Going Down", "Air", "My Conviction", "Abie Baby", "Frank Mills", and "What a Piece of Work is Man". The latter five songs were originally recorded for the film but were eventually cut. They can be found on this album, although they were omitted on the 1990 reissue. 

A new song written by MacDermot for the film is "Somebody to Love".  A few verses from "Manchester, England" and a small portion of "Walking in Space" have been removed. While the songs "Don't Put It Down" and "Somebody to Love" are not sung by characters in the movie, they are both used as background or instrumental music for scenes at the army base. There are several other differences from songs in the movie and as they appear on the soundtrack, mainly in omitted verses and different orchestrations.

Soundtrack

Certifications

See also
Hair (Original Off-Broadway Cast Recording)
Hair (Original Broadway Cast Recording)

References

1979 soundtrack albums
RCA Victor soundtracks